Brombya is a genus of flowering plants belonging to the family Rutaceae.

Its native range is Queensland.

Species:

Brombya platynema 
Brombya smithii

References

Zanthoxyloideae
Zanthoxyloideae genera